The Malaysian football league system, also known as the Malaysian football pyramid, is a series of interconnected leagues for men's association football clubs in Malaysia. The system has a hierarchical format with promotion and relegation between leagues at different levels, allowing even the smallest club the hypothetical possibility of ultimately rising to the very top of the system. The exact number of clubs varies from year to year as clubs join and leave leagues or fold altogether, but an estimated average of 10 clubs per division implies that hundreds of teams are members of a league in the Malaysian men's football league system.

History 

Football arrived in Malaysia (Malaya at that time) with the British. The locals soon picked up the game, and before long it was the country's leading sport. Towards the end of the 19th century, football was one of the central pillars of most sports clubs in Malaya, but it was not structured. Even when the Selangor Amateur Football League took shape in 1905 – which ensured proper administration and organisation – the competition was confined only to clubs in Kuala Lumpur. In 1933, the Football Association of Malaysia was founded which managed the local football scene at that time. By 1954, the FAM joined FIFA as a member of the AFC.

The system consists of a pyramid of leagues, bound together by the principle of promotion and relegation. A certain number of the most successful clubs in each league can rise to a higher league, whilst those that finish at the bottom of their league can find themselves sinking down a level. In addition to sporting performance, promotion is usually contingent on meeting criteria set by the higher league, especially concerning appropriate facilities and finances. In theory it is possible for a lowly local amateur club to rise to the pinnacle of the Malaysian game and become champions of the Malaysia Super League. As the main leagues in Malaysia consist of three tiers, it is possible for a new team to become champions in just three years if they perform well within the pyramid.

The top three levels contain one division each and are nationwide in scope. Below this, the levels have progressively more parallel leagues, which each covering progressively smaller geographic areas. Many leagues have more than one division and at the lower levels the existence of leagues becomes intermittent. There are also leagues in various parts of the country, which are not officially part of the system as they do not have formal agreements with the football associations and are run by independent organisers. These are mostly held in the form of carnival styles, where the league's duration is just a couple of days instead of months. Clubs from state leagues may, if they feel meet the appropriate standard of play and have suitable facilities, can apply to join a league which does form part of the system.

The top two levels of the Malaysian football league system are operated by the Malaysian Football League, which consists of the Malaysia Super League and the Malaysia Premier League. All clubs in these two leagues are fully professional. The third and fourth levels of the Malaysian football league system are operated by the Amateur Football League, a subsidiary of the Malaysian Football League, which consists of the Malaysia M3 League and the Malaysia M4 League. All clubs in these competitions are either amateur or semi-professional clubs.

The fourth level of the Malaysian football league system consists of leagues that run in parallel. The league is managed by the Amateur Football League (AFL) in collaboration with each state Football Associations and independent football league organizers. It is an amateur level league consisting of community clubs, social clubs, professional clubs, and company clubs from their respective states all over Malaysia which compete in their own regional state league which has multiple divisions within it. It consists of 10 social leagues recognized by the AFL that run all around Malaysia.

Current structure 
The Malaysia Super League is the highest level of the Malaysia football league system with the second level being the Malaysia M2 League. The Malaysia Super League are professional leagues which are governed and operated by the Malaysian Football League and consists of 14 clubs in top tier division. The third and fourth level is the Malaysia M3 League and Malaysia M4 League which consists of 14 and 25 clubs and is an semi-professional league competition respectively from 2023. The champions from the 5 FA State Leagues and 10 Social Leagues go into a play-off competition for a chance to be promoted to the Malaysia M4 League. The Malaysia M5 League is governed and operated by the Amateur Football League (AFL), a subsidiary company of Malaysian Football League; while the Malaysia M5 League was operated by independent bodies and state football associations before the AFL took governance of the Malaysia M5 League in 2019.

The table below shows the 2023 season structure of the system. For each division, its official name, sponsorship name (which differs from its historic name) and number of clubs are given. At levels 1–5, each division promotes clubs to the division that is directly above it and relegates clubs to the division that is directly below it. In the table below, each individual league article details promotion and relegation arrangements.

Men's League 

The Malaysia M5 League is a combination of the state FA leagues, social leagues and community leagues in Malaysia. They are administered and operated by their state football associations and independent operators under the governance of the Amateur Football League (AFL). The level immediately above is the Malaysia M3 League and Malaysia M4 League the semi-professional leagues respectively.

Development League 

The MFL Cup is a Reserve League for football club competing in the Malaysia Super League as well as for those footballers from the National Football Development Programme of Malaysia and Mokhtar Dahari Football Academy. It also act as a bridge for players to get invaluable playing time and much-needed adaptation opportunities in preparation for the Malaysia Super League. It is the only development league administered by Malaysian Football League while the rest of the development league were operated by Football Association of Malaysia, Malaysia Ministry of Education (Ministry of Education (MOE) League) and Maxim Events (Malaysia SupaRimau League) under the governance of by the Football Association of Malaysia.

Others Youth Competition

Women's

Promotion and relegation rules for the top four levels 
 Malaysia Super League (level 1, 14 clubs (16 from 2024)):  The bottom two clubs are relegated, no relegation from 2022.
 Malaysia M2 League (level 2, TBD clubs):  The top two automatically promoted (four teams non reserve team automatically promoted in 2022), the bottom two are relegated, (two teams non reserve team had been play-out against champions and runner-up of M3 League in 2022). No running in 2023.
 Malaysia M3 League (level 3, 14 clubs): The top two teams are automatically promoted to Super League, however this is subjected to the club's regulation licensing. Currently two bottom teams is automatically relegation information in this league. Sometimes, clubs might withdraw for financial reasons and might be given permission to play in the Malaysia M4 League.
 Malaysia M4 League (level 4, 15 clubs): The top two teams are automatically promoted to M3 League, however this is subjected to the club's regulation licensing. Currently there is no relegation information in this league. Sometimes, clubs might withdraw for financial reasons and might be given permission to play in the Malaysia M5 League.
 Malaysia M5 League (level 5, various clubs, running in parallel): The champions in each division might be promoted to the Malaysia M3 League if they want to play at the next level as long as they fulfill the requirements in terms of club preparation, account balances and other rules set by the MFL.

Cup eligibility 
Being members of a league at a particular level also affects eligibility for Cups, or single-elimination competitions.
 Malaysia Cup: Level 1
 Malaysia FA Cup: Levels 1 to 4
 Malaysia Challenge Cup: Levels 1 to 2
 Malaysia FAM Cup: Levels 3 to 4
 Piala Sumbangsih is a single match played each February between the winner of the Malaysia Cup and the Malaysia Super League champions.

Former structures 

Before the current system, the Malaysian football league system underwent multiple iterations since its introduction in 1979 and the country's men's football league competition was officially inaugurated in 1982 with the introduction of league trophy for the winners.

Amateur league system (1982–1988) 

A football league competition involving the representative sides of the state football associations was first held in Malaysia in 1979. When it began, it was intended primarily as a qualifying tournament for the final knock-out stages of the Malaysia Cup. It was not until 1982 that a league trophy was introduced to recognise the winners of the preliminary stage as the league champions. Over the years, the league competition has gained an important stature in its own right.

Below is the Malaysian amateur football league system from 1982 to 1988:

Semi-Pro league system (1989–1993) 

In the early days, the Malaysian football league system consisted of an amateur league before the changes that took place in 1989, when it was known as the Liga Semi-Pro (MSPFL) from 1989 to 1993. Initially the only teams allowed to participate in the league were the state FA sides, alongside teams representing the Malaysian Armed Forces and the Royal Malaysian Police, and teams representing the neighbouring countries of Singapore and Brunei. However, the Football Association of Singapore pulled out of the Malaysian League after the 1994 season following a dispute with the Football Association of Malaysia over gate receipts and shifted their focus on establishing their own league while Brunei ended their representative team's involvement in Malaysia at the end of 2005 after winning the Malaysia Cup in 1999, though the country was represented by DPMM FC for a further three seasons in the top two divisions before moving to Singapore for almost a decade and returning back to their national league in 2021.

The inaugural season of MSPFL consisted of nine teams in Division 1 and eight teams in Division 2. Games were played on a home and away basis for about four months roughly between the end of April or early May and the end of August or early September. For the first season three points were awarded for a win, one for a draw and none for a loss, but in subsequent seasons this was changed to a 2, 1 and 0 basis. At the end of the league season the top three placed teams in both divisions received prize money while two were relegated/promoted and a playoff was staged between the eighth placed team in Division 1 and the third placed team in Division 2. The top six teams in Division 1 and top two in Division 2 also proceeded to the quarter-finals of the Malaysia Cup.

In 1992, the FAM created another amateur league for local clubs in Malaysia to compete, which was called the Liga Nasional The league was managed by an outside entity beyond the FAM, called Super Club Sdn. Bhd. Some of the clubs which competed in the league were Hong Chin, Muar FA, PKNK from Kedah, DBKL, PKNS, BSN, LPN, BBMB, Proton, PPC and PKENJ. Unfortunately, the league only ran for a couple of seasons before it folded. Some of the clubs then evolved and joined the higher leagues, such as PKENJ, which later became Johor Darul Ta'zim F.C.

From 1989 to 1993, the Liga Semi-Pro was divided into two levels:
 First Division: Liga Semi-Pro Divisyen 1
 Second Division: Liga Semi-Pro Divisyen 2

Professional football league system (1994–1997) 

Between 1994 and 1997, there was no second level league as the top two leagues were combined. 1994 was when Malaysian football turned professional. The MSPFL became the Liga Perdana, which was the de facto top-tier league in Malaysia and with two cup competitions, when the Malaysia FA Cup was founded in 1990; and joined alongside the existing Malaysia Cup. With the formation of the professional football league in 1994, Malaysia FAM Cup was held again as yearly competition after being absent from 1986 to 1990 and 1992 to 1993.

The newly formed professional football league was almost in peril when a bribing and corruption scandal was discovered between 1994 and 1995. 21 players and coaches were sacked, 58 players were suspended and 126 players were questioned over corruption by Malaysian authorities.
 First Division: Liga Perdana

In 1997, promotion from the Malaysia FAM Cup to the professional M-League was introduced for the first time. Johor FC and NS Chempaka FC were the first two sides to be promoted that year.

Malaysian league system (1998–2003) 
From 1998 to 2003, the professional football league in Malaysia was divided again into two levels:

In later years, top Malaysian club teams have also been admitted to the league competition. The exemption for a state FA's team from being relegated was lifted in order to promote a healthy competition in the league.

System revamp (2004) 
The league was revamped to be a fully professional league in 2004 following the decision by the Football Association of Malaysia (FAM) to privatise the league, but it was not fully privatised. As a result, MSL Sendirian Berhad (or MSL Proprietary Limited) was created to oversee the marketing aspects of the league top-tier league at that time.

In 2005, The Malaysia FAM Cup became a third-tier competition and the format of the competition was changed to include a two-group league followed by the traditional knockout format.

Between 2004 and 2006, the professional football leagues in Malaysia was divided into two levels and two groups in the second level:
 First Division: Malaysia Super League
 Second Division: Malaysia Premier League Group A
 Second Division: Malaysia Premier League Group B

Below is the Malaysian football league system revamp in 2004:

At the end of the season, the top team from each group of the Malaysia Premier League were promoted to the Malaysia Super League. The teams which finished at the bottom of each group were relegated to the Malaysia FAM League. The two group champions also faced off to determine the Malaysia Premier League Champion.

System restructure (2007–2022) 
From 2007 until the present day, the professional football league in Malaysia was in two vertical levels again when the two Malaysia Premier League groups were combined into a single division. For the 2006-07 season, the Malaysia Premier League was reorganised into a single league of 11 teams instead of being a competition involving two separate groups of teams. Below is the Malaysian football league system in 2007:

In 2008, FAM changed the Malaysia FAM Cup to a league format which served as a third-tier league in the Malaysian football league system and become known as the Malaysia FAM League starting from the 2009 season.

Below is the Malaysian football league system in 2009:

Below is the Malaysian football league system in 2013 - 2018:

Below is the Malaysian football league system in 2019 - 2022:

See also 
 League system, for a list of similar systems in other countries
 History of Malaysian football
 List of Malaysia football champions

References 

Football in Malaysia
Football league systems in Asia